Alexander Grigorevich Berezensky (born 15 August 1979 in Karaganda) is a Kazakhstani retired ice hockey player. During his career he played for several teams, including Arystan Temirtau in the Kazakhstan Hockey Championship league.

References

External links

1979 births
Living people
Arystan Temirtau players
Barys Nur-Sultan players
Kazakhstani ice hockey defencemen
Saryarka Karagandy players
Sportspeople from Karaganda
Yenbek Almaty players
Yertis Pavlodar players